Dhanmandal railway station is a railway station on the East Coast Railway network in the state of Odisha, India. It serves Dhanmandal village. Its code is DNM. It has three platforms. Passenger, MEMU, Express trains halt at Dhanmandal railway station.

Major trains

 East Coast Express
 Dhauli Express
 Neelachal Express

See also
 Jajpur district

References

Railway stations in Jajpur district
Khurda Road railway division